This is a list of neurosteroids, or natural and synthetic steroids that are active on the mammalian nervous system through receptors other than steroid hormone receptors. It includes inhibitory, excitatory, and neurotrophic neurosteroids as well as pheromones and vomeropherines. In contrast to steroid hormones, neurosteroids have rapid, non-genomic effects through interactions with membrane steroid receptors and can quickly influence central nervous system function.

Inhibitory

Natural

Cholestanes
 25-Hydroxycholesterol: cholest-5-en-3β,25-diol – NMDA receptor negative allosteric modulator

Androstanes
 3α,5α-Androstanediol (3α-androstanediol): 5α-androstane-3α,17β-diol – GABAA receptor positive allosteric modulator
 3α,5β-Androstanediol (etiocholanediol): 5β-androstane-3α,17β-diol – GABAA receptor positive allosteric modulator
 3α-Androstenol: 5α-androst-16-en-3α-ol – GABAA receptor positive allosteric modulator
 Androsterone: 5α-androstan-3α-ol-17-one – GABAA receptor positive allosteric modulator
 Etiocholanolone: 5β-androstan-3α-ol-17-one – GABAA receptor positive allosteric modulator

The following are proneurosteroids:

 Dihydrotestosterone (DHT; androstanolone, stanolone): 5α-androst-17β-ol-3-one – of the above-listed inhibitory androstane neurosteroids
 Testosterone: androst-4-en-17β-ol-3-one – of the above-listed inhibitory androstane neurosteroids

Pregnanes
 3α-Dihydroprogesterone (3α-DHP): pregn-4-en-3α-ol-20-one – GABAA receptor positive allosteric modulator
 5α-Dihydroprogesterone (5α-DHP; allopregnanedione): 5α-pregnane-3,20-dione – GABAA receptor positive allosteric modulator
 5β-Dihydroprogesterone (5β-DHP; pregnanedione): 5β-pregnane-3,20-dione – GABAA receptor positive allosteric modulator
 Allopregnanediol: 5α-pregnane-3α,20α-diol – GABAA receptor positive allosteric modulator
 Allopregnanolone (brexanolone; SAGE-547): 5α-pregnan-3α-ol-20-one – GABAA receptor positive allosteric modulator
 Dihydrodeoxycorticosterone (DHDOC): 21-hydroxy-5α-pregnan-20-one – GABAA receptor positive allosteric modulator
 Pregnanediol: 5β-pregnan-3α,20α-diol – GABAA receptor positive allosteric modulator
 Pregnanolone (eltanolone): 5β-pregnan-3α-ol-20-one – GABAA receptor positive allosteric modulator
 Tetrahydrodeoxycorticosterone (THDOC): 3α,21-dihydroxy-5α-pregnan-20-one – GABAA receptor positive allosteric modulator

The following are proneurosteroids:

 Deoxycorticosterone (desoxycortone): 21-hydroxypregn-4-ene-3,20-dione  – of DHDOC and THDOC
 Pregnenolone (P5): pregn-5-en-3β-ol-20-one – of pregnanolones and pregnanediols (see above)
 Progesterone (P4): pregn-4-ene-3,20-dione – of pregnanediones, pregnanolones, and pregnanediols (see above)

Synthetic

Cholestanes
 Acebrochol (cholesteryl acetate dibromide): 5α,6β-dibromocholestan-3β-ol 3β-acetate – GABAA receptor positive allosteric modulator

Pregnanes
 Alfadolone: 3α,21-dihydroxy-5α-pregnane-11,20-dione – GABAA receptor positive allosteric modulator
 Alfadolone acetate: 3α,21-dihydroxy-5α-pregnane-11,20-dione 21-acetate – GABAA receptor positive allosteric modulator
 Alfaxalone: 3α-hydroxy-5α-pregnane-11,20-dione – GABAA receptor positive allosteric modulator
 EIDD-036 (P4-20-O): 20-(hydroxyimino)pregn-4-en-3-one – progesterone-like inhibitory neurosteroid
 Ganaxolone: 3β-methyl-5α-pregnan-3α-ol-20-one – GABAA receptor positive allosteric modulator
 Hydroxydione: 21-hydroxy-5β-pregnane-3,20-dione – GABAA receptor positive allosteric modulator
 Minaxolone: 11α-(dimethylamino)-2β-ethoxy-5α-pregnan-3α-ol-20-one – GABAA receptor positive allosteric modulator
 ORG-20599: 21-chloro-2β-morpholin-4-yl-5β-pregnan-3α-ol-20-one – GABAA receptor positive allosteric modulator
 ORG-21465: 2β-(2,2-dimethyl-4-morpholinyl)-3α-hydroxy-11,20-dioxo-5α-pregnan-21-yl methanesulfonate – GABAA receptor positive allosteric modulator
 Posovolone (Co 134444): 3β-Hydroxy-21-(1H-imidazol-1-yl)-3α-(methoxymethyl)-5α-pregnan-20-one – GABAA receptor positive allosteric modulator
 Renanolone: 5β-pregnan-3α-ol-11,20-dione – GABAA receptor positive allosteric modulator
 SGE-516 – GABAA receptor positive allosteric modulator
 SGE-872  – GABAA receptor positive allosteric modulator
 Zuranolone (SAGE-217): 3α-hydroxy-3β-methyl-21-(4-cyano-1H-pyrazol-1'-yl)-19-nor-5β-pregnan-20-one – GABAA receptor positive allosteric modulator

The following are proneurosteroids:

 EIDD-1723 – of EIDD-036 (see above)
 P1-185 – of progesterone and by extension pregnanediones, pregnanolones, and pregnanediols (see above)
 Progesterone carboxymethyloxime (P4-3-CMO) – of progesterone and by extension pregnanediones, pregnanolones, and pregnanediols (see above)

Excitatory

Natural

Cholestanes
 Cerebrosterol (24(S)-Hydroxycholesterol): cholest-5-en-3β,24S-diol – NMDA receptor positive allosteric modulator

Pregnanes
 3β-Dihydroprogesterone (3β-DHP): pregn-4-en-3β-ol-20-one – GABAA receptor negative allosteric modulator
 Epipregnanolone: 5β-pregnan-3β-ol-20-one – GABAA receptor negative allosteric modulator
 Isopregnanolone (sepranolone): 5α-pregnan-3β-ol-20-one – GABAA receptor negative allosteric modulator
 Pregnenolone sulfate (PS): pregn-5-en-3β-ol-20-one 3β-sulfate – GABAA receptor negative allosteric modulator, NMDA receptor positive allosteric modulator, sigma-1 receptor agonist, TRPM3 agonist, other actions

The following are proneurosteroids:

 Pregnenolone (P5): pregn-5-en-3β-ol-20-one – of pregnenolone sulfate

Androstanes
 Dehydroepiandrosterone (DHEA; prasterone): androst-5-en-3β-ol-17-one – GABAA receptor positive allosteric modulator, NMDA receptor positive allosteric modulator, sigma-1 receptor agonist, other actions
 Dehydroepiandrosterone sulfate (DHEA-S; prasterone sulfate): androst-5-en-3β-ol-17-one 3β-sulfate – GABAA receptor negative allosteric modulator, NMDA receptor positive allosteric modulator, other actions

Synthetic

Androstanes
 17-Phenylandrostenol (17-PA): 17-phenyl-5α-androst-16-en-3α-ol – GABAA receptor negative allosteric modulator
 Golexanolone (GR-3027): 3α-ethynyl-3β-hydroxyandrostan-17E-one oxime – GABAA receptor negative allosteric modulator

Others
 SAGE-201 - oxysterol/cholesterol analogue – NMDA receptor positive allosteric modulator
 SAGE-301 - oxysterol/cholesterol analogue – NMDA receptor positive allosteric modulator
 SAGE-718: oxysterol/cholesterol analogue; exact chemical structure undisclosed – NMDA receptor positive allosteric modulator

Mixed

Natural

Cholestanes
 Cholesterol: cholest-5-en-3β-ol – NMDA receptor positive allosteric modulator, possible GABAA receptor positive allosteric modulator, many other actions

Pregnanes
 Epipregnanolone sulfate: 5β-pregnan-3β-ol-20-one 3β-sulfate – GABAA and NMDA receptor negative allosteric modulator, TRPM3 agonist

Neurotrophic

Natural

Androstanes
 Dehydroepiandrosterone (DHEA; prasterone): androst-5-en-3β-ol-17-one – TrkA, TrkC, and p75NTR agonist, TrkB ligand
 Dehydroepiandrosterone sulfate (DHEA-S; prasterone sulfate): androst-5-en-3β-ol-17-one 3β-sulfate – TrkA and p75NTR agonist

Ergostanes
 Anicequol (NGA0187, NGD-187): 16β-acetoxy-3β,7β,11β-trihydroxy-5α-ergost-22(E)-en-6-one – non-endogenous; fungi-derived; undefined mechanism of action; shows neurotrophic activity in vitro; was formerly under development for the treatment of cognitive disorders

Synthetic

Androstanes
 BNN-20: 17β-spiro-(androst-5-en-17,2'-oxiran)-3β-ol – TrkA, TrkB, and p75NTR agonist

Pregnanes
 BNN-27: 17α,20R-epoxypregn-5-ene-3β,21-diol – TrkA and p75NTR agonist

Antineurotrophic

Natural

Androstanes
 Testosterone: androst-4-en-17β-ol-3-one – TrkA and p75NTR antagonist

Synthetic

Pregnanes
 Dexamethasone: 9α-fluoro-11β,17α,21-trihydroxy-16α-methylpregna-1,4-diene-3,20-dione – TrkA and p75NTR antagonist

Pheromones and pherines

Natural

Androstanes
 3α-Androstenol: 5α-androst-16-en-3α-ol
 3β-Androstenol: 5α-androst-16-en-3β-ol
 Androstadienol: androsta-5,16-dien-3β-ol
 Androstadienone: androsta-4,16-dien-3-one
 Androstenone: 5α-androst-16-en-3-one
 Androsterone: 5α-androstan-3α-ol-17-one

Estranes
 Estratetraenol: estra-1,3,5(10),16-tetraen-3-ol

Synthetic

Androstanes
 Fasedienol (Aloradine; PH94B; 4-androstadienol): androsta-4,16-dien-3β-ol

Estranes
 Estratetraenyl acetate (ETA): estra-1,3,5(10),16-tetraen-3-yl acetate

Pregnanes
 Pregnadienedione (PDD): pregna-4,20-dien-3,6-dione

Others
 PH10, PH15, PH30, PH56, PH78, PH84, Salubrin (PH80) – pherines with undefined structures developed by a company called Pherin Pharmaceuticals

Others

Natural

Pregnanes
 Pregnenolone (P5): pregn-5-en-3β-ol-20-one – MAP2 ligand
 Progesterone (P4): pregn-4-ene-3,20-dione – sigma-1 receptor antagonist, nicotinic acetylcholine receptor negative allosteric modulator, MAP2 ligand, other actions

Spirostanes
 Caprospinol (SP-233; diosgenin 3-caproate): (22R,25R)-20α-spirost-5-en-3β-yl hexanoate – β-amyloid ligand, sigma-1 receptor ligand, other actions; found naturally in Gynura japonica; under development as a neuroprotective against Alzheimer's disease

Estranes
 Estradiol (E2): Estra-1,3,5(10)-triene-3,17β-diol; found to increase the expression of the oxytocin receptor.

Synthetic

Pregnanes
 3β-Methoxypregnenolone (MAP-4343): 3β-methoxypregn-5-en-20-one – MAP2 ligand
 Cyclopregnol (neurosterone): 6β-hydroxy-3:5-cyclopregnan-20-one – undefined mechanism of action; developed as a "psychotropic agent" for the treatment of "mental disorders" such as schizophrenia in the 1950s

Androstanes
 Cetadiol: androst-5-ene-3β,16α-diol – undefined mechanism of action; developed as a "tranquilizer" and for the treatment of alcoholism in the 1950s

See also
 List of steroids
 Neurosteroidogenesis inhibitor

References

Neurosteroids
Neuroactive steroids